The number of magazines began to increase from 1928 when the language reform was initiated. In 1941 the number of magazines published in Turkey was 227. Five years later it became 302 in 1946.

The following is an incomplete list of current and defunct magazines published in Turkey. They may be published in Turkish or in other languages.

0-9
 2000'e Doğru

A

 Adam Sanat
 Akbaba
 Akis
 Aksiyon
 Altüst
 Anadolu Mecmuası
 Ant 
 Arayış
 Ateş hırsızı
 Atlas
 Aydede

B

 BAK
 Bayan Yanı
 Bilim ve Teknik
 Billboard Türkiye
 Birikim
 Bütün Dünya
 Büyük Mecmua
 Büyük Doğu

C
 Cafcaf
 Cem

Ç
 Çarşaf

D

 Davetsiz Misafir
 Dergâh
 Diyojen
 Doğan Kardeş

E

 Ekonomist
 Elele
 Eskişehirspor Magazine
 Eşref

F
 Forum

G
 Galatasaray
 Genç Kalemler
 Gırgır

H

 Hanımeli
 Hayat
 Her Ay
 Hey

K

 Kadın Gazetesi
 Kadınca
 Kadınlık
 Kadro
 Karagöz
 Kim

M
 Marko Paşa
 Milliyet Çocuk

N
 Nokta
 NTV Tarih

O
 Ortam

P
 Penguen

R
 Resimli Ay
 Resimli Perşembe
 Rodeo Strip

S

 Sebilürreşad
 Ses
 Sevimli Ay
 Socrates

T

 Tempo
 Tercüme
 Türk Edebiyatı
 Türk Kadın Yolu
 Türk Kadını
 Türk Yurdu

Ü
 Ülkü

V
 Varlık

Y

 Yarım Ay
 Yazko Edebiyat
 Yedigün
 Yeni Aktüel
 Yeni Dergi
 Yeni Kafkasya
 Yeni Ufuklar
 Yurt ve Dünya
 Yön

See also
List of newspapers in Turkey

References

Turkey
Magazines